The Church of the Holy Annunciation is a Serbian Orthodox church in Dubrovnik, south Croatia. It was built in 1877.

History
On April 30, 1867, in the Municipal Assembly, rich trader Božo Bošković bought three houses of baron Frano Gondola with a garden behind them for a sum of 28,500 fiorins inside the Walls of Dubrovnik in the old town.

The church has a valuable collection of icons, some of them dating from the 15th and 16th centuries.
A comprehensive history of the church and its parish entitled The Serbian Orthodox Church in Dubrovnik to the Twentieth Century was published in Dubrovnik, Belgrade and in Trebinje in 2007. The book was published in the Gaj's Latin and the Serbian Cyrillic alphabet

Damage and reconstruction
The church sustained damage from bombing during the Siege of Dubrovnik.

In 2009, the church was restored using funds from the Ministry of Culture of Croatia, City of Dubrovnik, Dubrovnik-Neretva County, private contributions and credit. This was the first restoration of the church.

Museum of Serbian Orthodox Church in Dubrovnik
The church community maintains a museum of the Serbian Orthodox Church in Dubrovnik. It keeps religious objects such as a copy of the Miroslav Gospels from 1897, a gospel in Russian printed in Moscow in 1805 and busts of Ivan Gundulić and Vuk Stefanović Karadžić
The museum also has 18 portraits. Of these, 9 depict Vlaho Bukovac Other portraits depict Medo Pucić, Valtazar Bogišić, Petar II Petrović-Njegoš and Vuk Stefanović Karadžić. A number of old gospels, big collection of icons, highly decorated priest robes, chalices and jewellery is also kept as a part of the Museum collection.

Library of Serbian Orthodox Church in Dubrovnik
The church owns a library of about 12 000 books. In addition to liturgical books in Church Slavonic language, there are also books on different themes in Italian, French, Russian and other languages. Of note are a New Testament printed in Kiev in 1703 and a Menologium printed in Kiev in 1757

See also
 Serbs of Dubrovnik
 Walls of Dubrovnik
 Dubrovnik Synagogue
 Dubrovnik Cathedral
 St. Saviour Church, Dubrovnik
 Eparchy of Zahumlje and Herzegovina
 List of Serbian Orthodox churches in Croatia

References

Buildings and structures in Dubrovnik
Serbian Orthodox church buildings in Croatia
Churches completed in 1877
19th-century Serbian Orthodox church buildings
Neo-Byzantine architecture
Tourist attractions in Dubrovnik-Neretva County
1877 establishments in Austria-Hungary